Ujjain Engineering College is an engineering college in Ujjain city  in the state of Madhya Pradesh, India. The college was established by the government of Madhya Pradesh in 1966.

History 
The college was founded as Government Engineering College, Ujjain, in 1966 by the government of Madhya Pradesh, with a view to improve technical education. The college was declared autonomous by the state government in 1997. Under this arrangement, the college is governed by a governing body, whose chairman is the minister of the Manpower Planning Department of the state government and the secretary is the college's principal. The college is recognized by the All India Council of Technical Education.

Campus 
The college's campus covers nearly 300 acres of land situated at Indore Road.

Courses 
Initially there were only three branches of engineering, i.e. civil engineering, mechanical engineering and electrical engineering. Later on, electronics engineering (1985) and chemical engineering (1986) branches were introduced. A Bachelor of Engineering in computer science and engineering course was commenced in the 2001-2002 year. 
The college has post-graduate programs in engineering in various streams, including an Electronics and Communication course that commenced in 2012. The college is also a research center for Doctorate programs in various engineering fields.

Events 
Festivals include:
 Technical Events festival
 Mech Tech Meet (MTM): The institute's annual technical festival, first held on 6 March 2010.

Cultural and social events include:
 Aayam: A college annual function organized within college premises.
 Xception: A college cultural and social festival, organized by the students, with online and offline events.

Clubs 
Litoffer is a literature and personality development club that started in September 2015 and encourages students to improve their skills in public speaking and writing. It conducts debates, group discussions, extempore speaking and academic events.

References

External links
Official website
Xception website
Mech Tech Meet website
 https://www.facebook.com/xception.co.in/
 https://www.aicte-india.org/sites/default/files/CRS_Circular.pdf

Educational institutions established in 1966
Engineering colleges in Madhya Pradesh
Education in Ujjain
1966 establishments in Madhya Pradesh
Buildings and structures in Ujjain